Carlos Garcia may refer to:

Sportspeople

Association football
Carlos García Cambón (born 1949), Argentine football manager and former striker
Carlos García (footballer, born 1957), Mexican football midfielder
Carlos García Cantarero (born 1961), Spanish football manager
Carlos García (footballer, born 1970), Spanish football centre-back and midfielder
Carlos García (footballer, born 1971), Venezuelan football defender
Carlos García (footballer, born 1978), Ecuadorian football forward
Carlos García (footballer, born 1979), Uruguayan football centre-back
Carlos García (footballer, born 1981), Colombian football defender
Carlitos (footballer, born 1982) (Carlos Alberto Alves Garcia), Portuguese football winger
Carlos García (footballer, born 1984), Spanish football centre-back
Carlos Garcia (American soccer) (fl. 1988–1998), American soccer midfielder
Carlos García (footballer, born 1993), Spanish football midfielder
Carlos García (Swedish footballer) (born 1993), Swedish football defender
Carlos García (footballer, born 1997), Mexican football defender
Carlos García-Die (born 2000), Spanish football defender

Other sports
Carlos Garcia (gymnast) (born 1942), Cuban gymnast
Carlos Garcia Palermo (born 1953), Argentine chess master
Carlos García (cyclist) (born 1964), Uruguayan Olympic cyclist
Carlos García (baseball) (born 1967), Venezuelan former major league baseball player
Carlos García (runner) (born 1975), Spanish distance runner
Carlos García Quesada (cyclist) (born 1978), Spanish road racing cyclist
Carlos Garcia (fighter), mixed martial artist, see his opponent Doug Marshall
Caloy Garcia, Filipino basketball player and coach

Others
Carlos García-Bedoya Zapata (1925–1980), Peruvian diplomat who served as Minister of Foreign Affairs in 1979
Carlos P. Garcia (1896–1971), Filipino poet and President
Charly García (born 1951), Argentine pop star
Carlos Garcia (actor), see Betão Ronca Ferro
Carlos Garcia (politician), former mayor of Pico Rivera, California
Carlos M. García (born 1971), Puerto Rican banker
Carlos García Portela (1921–2011), Puerto Rican politician and senator
Carlos Sotelo García (born 1961), Mexican politician